Albert Edward Pinxton (24 May 1912 – 1992) was a footballer who played in the Football League for Blackburn Rovers, Cardiff City and Torquay United.

Career statistics
Source:

References

1912 births
1992 deaths
English footballers
English Football League players
Stoke City F.C. players
Nantwich Town F.C. players
Blackburn Rovers F.C. players
Cardiff City F.C. players
Torquay United F.C. players
Association football forwards
Sportspeople from Hanley, Staffordshire